When Love Came to the Village (Swedish: När kärleken kom till byn) is a 1950 Swedish drama film directed by Arne Mattsson and starring Sven Lindberg,  Ruth Kasdan and Edvin Adolphson. It was made at the Centrumateljéerna Studios in Stockholm and on location in Gamleby and Västervik. The film's sets were designed by the art director P.A. Lundgren. It is noted for its more traditional depiction of romantic scenes compared to Mattsson's One Summer of Happiness the following year which featured nudity.

Synopsis
A substitute teacher arrives in a rural area of Sweden to take over the duties of the regular schoolmaster while he is in hospital. His new methods of teaching doesn't impress the locals and he begins a brief affair with the schoolmaster's wife with whom he is staying.

Cast
 Sven Lindberg as 	Birger Broman
 Ruth Kasdan as 	Karin
 Edvin Adolphson as 	J. O. Bengtsson
 Sigge Fürst as 	Martin
 Irma Christenson as 	Ella
 Ingrid Thulin as Agneta
 Stig Järrel as 	Teacher Axel Brunell
 Dagmar Ebbesen as 	Mrs. Sigrid Bengtsson
 Åke Fridell as 	Johan
 Ann Bornholm as Anna-Stina, student
 Artur Rolén as Johansson
 Rut Holm as 	Mrs. Filipson
 Axel Högel as 	Vicar
 Sven Magnusson as 	Blåberg
 Olav Riégo as 	Johansson
 Georg Skarstedt as Parish Clerk
 Ingemar Holde as 	Johan
 Wiktor Andersson as 	Man in poor-house
 Bengt Lindström as Helge
 Öyvind Serrander as 	Anders
 Julia Cæsar as Agneta's host
 Emmy Albiin as 	Old Lady 
 Sonja Rolén as 	Old Lady

References

Bibliography 
 Björklund, Elisabet & Larsson, Mariah. Swedish Cinema and the Sexual Revolution: Critical Essays. McFarland, 2016.
 Qvist, Per Olov & von Bagh, Peter. Guide to the Cinema of Sweden and Finland. Greenwood Publishing Group, 2000.

External links 
 

1950 films
Swedish drama films
1950 drama films
1950s Swedish-language films
Films directed by Arne Mattsson
Films based on Swedish novels
1950s Swedish films